Bruce Edward Hill (born February 29, 1964) is a former professional American football player who selected by the Tampa Bay Buccaneers in the fourth round of the 1987 NFL Draft. A 6'0", 180-lb. wide receiver from Arizona State, Hill played his entire NFL career for the Buccaneers from 1987 to 1993. His best year as a pro came during the 1988 season when he led all Tampa Bay receivers with 58 receptions for 1,040 yards and 9 touchdowns.

References

1964 births
Living people
American football wide receivers
Arizona State Sun Devils football players
Tampa Bay Buccaneers players
People from Fort Dix